Music book may refer to:

 Sheet music
 Song book
 Choirbook

See also 
Book music
Book musical
Book (disambiguation)
Music (disambiguation)
:Category:Music books